Marin Hamill (born April 5, 2001) is an American freestyle skier who competes internationally.

She competed in the FIS Freestyle Ski and Snowboarding World Championships 2021, where she placed fifth in women's ski slopestyle. She competed in the 2022 Winter Olympics in the Women's Slopestyle and Big Air events, placing twelfth and fourteenth respectively.

References

2001 births
Living people
American female freestyle skiers
21st-century American women
Freestyle skiers at the 2022 Winter Olympics
Olympic freestyle skiers of the United States